Matheus Thiago de Carvalho (born March 11, 1992), known as Matheus Carvalho, is a Brazilian footballer who plays for Náutico.

Career
On 31 January 2015, Carvalho moved on loan to AS Monaco FC till the end of the 2014–15 season, with an option for AS Monaco to make the deal permanent.

On 13 March 2015, Carvalho scored his first goal for AS Monaco FC vs Bastia.

Carvalho signed with North American Soccer League club Fort Lauderdale Strikers on 8 February 2016.

Honours
Fluminense
Campeonato Brasileiro Série A: 2010
 Campeonato Brasileiro Série A: 2012
 Taça Guanabara: 2012
 Campeonato Carioca: 2012

Joinville
Copa Santa Catarina: 2013

Atlético Clube Goianiense
Campeonato Brasileiro Série B: 2016

Náutico
Campeonato Brasileiro Série C: 2019
Campeonato Pernambucano: 2021

References

External links

1992 births
Living people
Brazilian footballers
Brazilian expatriate footballers
Fluminense FC players
Joinville Esporte Clube players
AS Monaco FC players
Fort Lauderdale Strikers players
Clube Náutico Capibaribe players
Campeonato Brasileiro Série A players
Campeonato Brasileiro Série B players
Expatriate footballers in Monaco
Brazilian expatriate sportspeople in Monaco
Association football forwards
Sportspeople from Niterói